Tūbelis is a Lithuanian surname. Notable people with the surname include:

Ąžuolas Tubelis (born 2002), Lithuanian basketball player 
Jadvyga Tūbelienė (1891-1988), one of the founders of the Lithuanian Women's Council, writer, journalist
Juozas Tūbelis
Marija Rima Tūbelytė-Kuhlmann (1923-2014), Lithuanian painter, writer, poet

See also

Lithuanian-language surnames

lt:Tubelis